Sayonara is a 1957 American Technicolor drama film starring Marlon Brando in Technirama. It tells the story of an American Air Force fighter pilot during the Korean War who falls in love with a famous Japanese dancer. The picture won four Academy Awards, including acting honors for co-stars Red Buttons and Miyoshi Umeki. The supporting cast also features Patricia Owens, James Garner, Martha Scott, Ricardo Montalbán, and Miiko Taka.

The screenplay was adapted by Paul Osborn from the 1954 novel of the same name by James Michener, and was directed by Joshua Logan and produced by William Goetz. Unlike most 1950s romantic dramas, it deals squarely with racism and prejudice.

Plot
Fighter ace Major Lloyd "Ace" Gruver, of the United States Air Force,  the son of a U.S. Army general, is stationed at Itami Air Force Base near Kobe, Japan. He has been reassigned from combat duties in Korea by General Webster, the father of his fiancée, Eileen. While Ace and Eileen have been together for years, their relationship has become strained.

Airman Joe Kelly, who is Ace's enlisted crew chief, is about to wed a Japanese woman, Katsumi, in spite of the disapproval of the United States military establishment, which will not recognize the interracial marriage because it is generally illegal under American law. The Air Force, including Ace, is against the marriage. Ace and Joe have an argument during which Ace uses a racial slur to describe Katsumi. Ace eventually apologizes, then agrees to be Joe's best man at the wedding.

Ace falls in love with a Japanese entertainer, Hana-ogi, who is the lead performer for a Takarazuka-like theater company, whom he meets through Katsumi. Eileen realizes that Ace's attentions are no longer focused on her and begins a friendship with a famous Kabuki performer, Nakamura. When she overhears that Joe's house has been under surveillance by the Army, she believes that Ace is in danger and goes there to warn him.

Joe suffers further prejudice at the hands of openly hostile Colonel Crawford, pulling extra duty and all the less attractive assignments. When Joe and many others who are married to Japanese are targeted for transfer back to the United States, Joe realizes that he will not be able to take Katsumi, who is now pregnant. Ace goes to General Webster and pleads Joe's case, asking that he be allowed to remain in Japan. When the General refuses on the grounds that he cannot allow an exception, Ace tells him that he will be in the same situation, since he intends to marry Hana-ogi. Eileen and her mother are present for the exchange, and Ace apologizes for hurting her. Eileen realizes Ace never loved her the way he loves Hana-ogi and she leaves to see Nakamura.

Joe and Katsumi's home is boarded up by the military police and Ace is taken into custody by General Webster, where he is confined to quarters. He is told that he will most likely be sent back to the United States and Hana-ogi will be sent to Tokyo. Joe goes AWOL, and two Military Police seek Ace's help to find Joe through his local connections so he can be sent back to the U.S. and not be reported missing. Ace, accompanied by Captain Bailey, finds Joe and Katsumi secretly returned to their home and committed double suicide rather than be parted. Shortly thereafter, Hana-ogi arrives unnoticed and alone outside Joe and Katsumi's home. There she opens a rear window and, still unseen, secretly whispers a tearful "sayonara" to Joe, Katsumi, and Ace, although nobody hears or sees her. Hana-ogi then leaves through the rear gate.

Moments after exiting Joe's home Ace and Bailey are attacked by a group of Japanese holding anti-American signs, but sympathetic Japanese neighbors intervene to help the Americans, resulting in widespread fighting in the street. Ace and Bailey escape during the scuffles.

The loss of his friend Joe strengthens Ace's resolve to marry Hana-ogi, and Ace goes to the theater company to find her. There he learns Hana-ogi has already left Kobe for Tokyo a week ahead of schedule. General Webster, believing the crisis with Ace is averted, apologizes for what happened to Joe and Katsumi and tells Ace that laws will soon be passed to allow interracial marriages in the United States.

Ace leaves Kobe and flies to Tokyo. He tracks down Hana-ogi at her new venue in a Tokyo theater, where he pleads with her one last time to become his wife. They leave the theater and Hana-ogi announces to the waiting Japanese and American reporters that they intend to wed. When a Stars and Stripes military newspaper reporter asks Ace how he will explain his marriage to the "big brass" as well as to the Japanese, neither of which will be particularly happy, Ace says, "Tell 'em we said, 'Sayonara.'"

Cast
 Marlon Brando as Major Lloyd "Ace" Gruver, USAF
 Patricia Owens as Eileen Webster
 James Garner as Captain Mike Bailey, USMC
 Martha Scott as Mrs. Webster
 Miiko Taka as Hana-ogi
 Miyoshi Umeki as Katsumi Kelly
 Red Buttons as Airman Joe Kelly
 Kent Smith as Lt. Gen. Mark Webster
 Reiko Kuba as Fumiko
 Soo Yong as Teruko
 Ricardo Montalbán as Nakamura
 Douglass Watson as Colonel Crawford (credited as "Douglas Watson")

Production
According to Josh Logan, Marlon Brando was the first choice. He turned it down so they offered the part to Rock Hudson who had too many obligations at Universal. They tried Brando again who was reluctant, so they offered the female lead to Audrey Hepburn. Brando eventually agreed to do it if they changed the ending of the novel so the two lovers got married instead of the American leaving. Logan cast Ricardo Montalban after claiming he was unable to find a Japanese actor for the role.

Brando affected a nondescript Southern accent for Gruver, despite the objections of director Logan, who did not think a Southern accent was appropriate for a general's son who was educated at West Point. Logan later admitted to the author and journalist Truman Capote about Brando, "I've never worked with such an exciting, inventive actor. So pliable. He takes direction beautifully, and yet he always has something to add. He's made up this Southern accent for the part; I never would have thought of it myself, but, well, it's exactly right – it's perfection." Ricardo Montalbán, born in Mexico to Spanish immigrants, plays a Japanese character.

Garner wrote in his memoirs that he actively lobbied to play his role, one of the few times in his career he did this. It had originally been cast with John Smith, but Garner succeeded in getting the part.

Critical reception
Sayonara received widespread critical acclaim, particularly for its writing and cinematography, in addition to the acting ability of its cast. It won four Academy Awards, including acting honors for co-stars Red Buttons and Miyoshi Umeki. Review aggregator Rotten Tomatoes reports that 82% of critics out of 56 have given the film a positive review, with a rating average of 7.6/10.

It was number one at the US box office for five consecutive weeks in 1958. It earned $10.5 million in theatrical rentals in the United States and Canada and $5 million overseas.

Legacy 
Alongside the less successful Japanese War Bride (1952) and The Teahouse of the August Moon (1956), Sayonara is considered by some scholars to have increased racial tolerance in the United States by openly discussing interracial marriage. Other scholars have argued that it is one in a long list of films stereotyping Asian American women as "lotus blossom, geisha girl, china doll, or Suzie Wong".

Awards and nominations

The film is also recognized by American Film Institute in these lists:
 2002: AFI's 100 Years...100 Passions – Nominated
 2005: AFI's 100 Years of Film Scores – Nominated

See also
 List of American films of 1957

Notes

References

Bibliography

External links

 
 
 
 
 
 Trailer of Sayonara introduced by Miika Taka
The Duke and His Domain by Truman Capote
James Garner Interview on the Charlie Rose Show 
James Garner interview at Archive of American Television - (c/o Google Video) - March 17, 1999



1957 films
American romantic drama films
1957 romantic drama films
1950s English-language films
Films shot in Japan
Films set in Japan
Korean War films
Films featuring a Best Supporting Actor Academy Award-winning performance
Films featuring a Best Supporting Actor Golden Globe winning performance
Films featuring a Best Supporting Actress Academy Award-winning performance
Films that won the Best Sound Mixing Academy Award
Films whose art director won the Best Art Direction Academy Award
Films directed by Joshua Logan
Warner Bros. films
Films about interracial romance
American aviation films
Films about racism
Films based on works by James A. Michener
Films based on American novels
Japan in non-Japanese culture
1950s American films